The 2022 Azores Rallye was the 56th edition of Rallye Açores and took place between March 24 and 26, 2022. The event was the second round of the 2022 European Rally Championship. The event was based in Ponta Delgada and was contested over 14 stages.

Background
The event was opened to crews competing in European Rally Championship with its support categories and any private crews. Overall of 66 crews entered the event, with 42 crews entering ERC and 12 crews entering Portuguese Rally Championship.

Entry list

References

Rallye Açores
Rally Azores
2022 European Rally Championship season